Aguaragüe National Park and Integrated Management Natural Area (Parque Nacional y Área Natural de Manejo Integrado Serranía del Aguaragüe) is a protected area in Bolivia situated in the Tarija Department, Gran Chaco Province. The national park covers the whole of Serranía del Aguaragüe, the easternmost mayor Sub-Andean range.

The Southern Andean Yungas montane forests cover much of the park. A portion is in the Dry Chaco.

References

External links 
 www.fundesnap.org / Aguaragüe National Park and Integrated Management Natural Area  (Spanish)

National parks of Bolivia
Geography of Tarija Department
Gran Chaco
Protected areas established in 2000
2000 establishments in Bolivia
Southern Andean Yungas